Craig Wallace may refer to:

 Craig Wallace (politician) (born 1969), Australian politician
 Craig Wallace (cricketer) (born 1990), Scottish cricketer
 Craig David Wallace, Canadian television director, writer and producer